Alashankou is a border city in Bortala Mongol Autonomous Prefecture, Xinjiang Uyghur Autonomous Region, China. It is a port of entry by both railroad and highway from Kazakhstan as part of the Eurasian Land Bridge.

Overview
The city is named after the Dzungarian Gate (Alashankou in Chinese), a pass connecting the two countries through the Dzungarian Alatau mountains. West of the pass, the port of entry on the Kazakhstan side is Dostyk. The weather in Alashankou is harsh.

Alashankou is one of China's national first-class ports of entry. The volume of imports and exports passing through Alashankou accounts for 90% of the total for all of Xinjiang. Since 2010, it has surpassed Manzhouli, Inner Mongolia to become the busiest land port-of-entry in China.

Formerly a township-level port commission under the administration of Bole City, Alashankou was upgraded to a county-level city in December 2012. It has a permanent population of 10,000 and a floating population of 30,000.

Transport 
The agreement between the Soviet Union and the China to connect Kazakhstan with Western China by rail was achieved in 1954. On the Soviet side, the railway reached the border town of Druzhba (Dostyk) in 1959. On the Chinese side, however, the westward construction of the Lanzhou-Xinjiang railway was stopped once it reached Ürümqi in 1962. Due to the Sino-Soviet split, the railway link was not completed until September 12, 1990. The highway port of entry was opened in December 1995.

It is proposed to build a standard gauge transcontinental railway to link Europe and China to bypass these two breaks of gauge. This project was signed in 2004.

On July 10, 2010, Bole Alashankou Airport was opened with scheduled flights to Ürümqi.

Administrative divisions 

Alataw Subdistrict
Ebinur Subdistrict

Climate

See also 
 Alashankou railway station
 Lake Alakol

References

External links

China–Kazakhstan border crossings
Populated places in Xinjiang
County-level divisions of Xinjiang